Athanasius V (Greek: Αθανάσιος Ε΄) served as Ecumenical Patriarch during the period 1709–1711.

He descended from Crete. He studied in Halle, Saxony and was distinguished for his wide education, multilingualism (Latin, Arabic) and deep knowledge of ecclesiastic music. Firstly, he was elected Metropolitan bishop of Veliko Tarnovo and then, in 1692, of Edirne.

After Cyprianus of Constantinople's deposition and exile to Mount Athos, Cyril, metropolitan bishop of Cyzicus, was elected Patriarch, but after the intervention of the Grand Vizier Çorlulu Ali Pasha, Athanasius V became Patriarch. During his reign, he was suspected of pro-Catholic tendencies.

On 4 December 1711, he was deposed, and Cyril IV of Constantinople was restored to the throne. Then, he dedicated himself to studying until his death. He made great work in the domain of ecclesiastic music.

References

Sources 
 Οικουμενικό Πατριαρχείο
 Αποστολική Διακονία της Εκκλησίας της Ελλάδος
 Εγκυκλοπαίδεια Πάπυρος-Larousse-Britannica, 2007, vol. 2, p. 652
 Steven Runciman (2010). Η Μεγάλη Εκκλησία εν αιχμαλωσία. Εκδόσεις Γκοβόστη. .

Bishops of Adrianople
Metropolitans of Tarnovo
18th-century Ecumenical Patriarchs of Constantinople
Religious leaders from Crete
18th-century Greek people
University of Halle alumni
18th-century Greek musicians